Limmud FSU  (Former Soviet Union) is an international Jewish education organization that focuses on giving young Russian-speaking Jewish adults the opportunity to revitalize and restore Jewish learning and to strengthen Jewish identity in their communities. It was developed in 2006 by Chaim Chesler, founder (Israel); Sandra F. Cahn, co-founder (United States).
Limmud (from the Hebrew word meaning "to learn") was originally a British-Jewish educational charity, which produces a large annual winter conference at Warwick University and several other events around the year in the UK on the theme of Jewish learning.

The Limmud model, first developed in the UK, has now spread to many other countries. According to the Charity Commission, Limmud operates throughout England and Wales and also in Argentina, Australia, Austria, Belarus, Bosnia-Herzegovina, Brazil, Bulgaria, Canada, China, Croatia, France, Germany, Hong Kong, Hungary, India, Israel, Italy, Lithuania, Macedonia, Netherlands, New Zealand, Peru, Poland, Romania, Russia, Scotland, Serbia, South Africa, Sweden, Turkey, Ukraine and the United States of America.  Nearly 70 communities in 34 countries on six continents have hosted Limmud events including, in 2013 for the first time, Hong Kong, Peru, India and Montenegro. There are 18 Limmud communities in the United States and eight in Israel.

History 
Limmud FSU, which celebrated its tenth anniversary in 2016, holds educational conferences, which have attracted more than 80,000 participants in  Ukraine, Moldova, Belarus, Israel, Europe, Australia, Canada, Russia, Azerbaijan and the United States. Limmud FSU engages with young Jewish adults of Former Soviet Union backgrounds, offering them the tools to gain a better understanding of their Jewish identity and if they wish, to assume leadership roles in their local communities.

Limmud FSU events present Jewish learning and culture in its broadest sense through pluralistic, egalitarian volunteer-run conferences covering traditional subjects like the Bible and Talmud, to history, politics, Israel, the Middle-East conflict, theater, music and dance, the arts, literature and poetry, to Jewish cuisine, humor and folklore and much more.

Limmud ("study" in Hebrew), the volunteer-driven Jewish learning experience, started in the United Kingdom in 1980 and since then has spread to over 80 Jewish communities across the world, awakening inspiration in tens of thousands of participants. In the words of The Jerusalem Post, "Every place that has Jews should have its own Limmud."

In adapting the Limmud model to the special requirements of Jewish audiences from the Former Soviet Union world-wide, Limmud FSU has developed a unique approach to cultural and educational activities, through lectures, presentations and workshops specially designed for the needs of young Jewish adults who were deprived of the opportunity to learn about their culture during 70 years of Communist rule in the Soviet Union.

Goals 

Limmud FSU seeks:
 To redress the injustices suffered by the Jewish people in USSR under Communism, by helping to rebuild the Jewish intellectual and cultural tradition eradicated by the Holocaust and decades of Soviet oppression 
 To infuse young Jewish adults with a feeling for their own role in the process of remembrance, by including a serious Holocaust component in the content of every event. 
 To engage unaffiliated young Russian-speaking Jewish adults, mostly aged 23– 40, in a broad range of topics in an open, pluralistic, and dynamic learning environment.
 To empower young adults to participate in the revival of Jewish communities and culture and thus to develop a new generation of Jewish communal leaders.
 To strengthen Jewish identity and in so doing to ensure a vibrant and sustainable Jewish future.

Organizational structure 
Limmud FSU is governed by an International Steering Committee (ISC), which approves its programs and budgets. The ISC has representatives from supporting organizations, donor foundations and sponsors, as well as individuals who actively promote Limmud FSU’s educational and cultural work.

An Executive Committee sets operational policy for Limmud FSU, authorizes budgetary adjustments between ISC sessions and sets guidelines for the preparation of the annual work plan. Currently, its members include:  Matthew Bronfman, Chairman, International Steering Committee; Aaron Frenkel, President; Sandra Cahn, Co-Founder, chairs the FRD Committee, and Chaim Chesler, Founder, Limmud FSU, chairs the Executive Committee.

A professional project manager in each country reports to the Executive Director, Natasha Chechik. Carefully trained volunteer activists in each community comprise local organizing committees. The organizing committees work closely with project managers to develop the conference programming, volunteer and participant recruitment, marketing and outreach.

Limmud FSU projects 
 Limmud FSU Belarus  – www.limmud.by/en
 Limmud FSU Canada  – www.limmudfsu.ca
 Limmud FSU Moscow – www.limmud.ru
 Limmud FSU New York – www.limmudfsuus.org
 Limmud FSU West Coast – https://westcoast.limmudfsuus.org/
 Limmud FSU St Petersburg – www.limmud.spb.ru
 Limmud FSU Ukraine – www.limmud.org.ua
 Limmud FSU Israel – www.limmudfsu.org
 Limmud FSU Australia  - www.limmudfsu.org.au
 Limmud FSU Europe - http://www.limmudfsu.eu/en/
 Limmud FSU Baku - https://limmudfsubaku.org/baku-eng

Activities 
Utilizing the strength of Limmud model, volunteer training sessions and annual Limmud FSU conferences in each location attract lecturers and educators from the countries of the former Soviet Union, Europe, Israel, Australia and North America. Prominent writers, journalists, entrepreneurs and business leaders, scientists, actors and public personalities, including representatives from local Jewish organizations and communities, as well as a number of noted Jewish scholars and political figures, are among the presenters.

Local organizing committees in each country, composed mainly of young adults in their 20s and 30s, and programming and logistics committees are responsible for planning and implementing annual conferences and related local events.

Funding 
Limmud FSU International Foundation is registered in the United States as a 501(c)(3) not-for-profit organization, recognized by the Internal Revenue Service (IRS). Limmud FSU follows a policy of gradual incremental rises in the level of participation fees to ensure appropriate payment for a quality program. The aim is to bring each community to a level of 80 percent of the direct costs of their conferences. Currently, a global network of private individuals and partner organizations funds annual Limmud FSU conferences and volunteer training sessions.

Limmud FSU Labs 
Limmud FSU Labs is a joint project of Limmud FSU and the Ministry of Diaspora Affairs of the State of Israel, established in 2019. The goal is to create a meaningful and ongoing platform for varying forms of Jewish expression among different communities of young Russian-speaking Jews around the world, in order to promote a sense of national, collective and personal identity with the Jewish people and with the State of Israel.  

Through the project, regional "Laboratories" are being created to provide comprehensive support, both professional and financial, for the development of educational and community initiatives among young Russian-speaking Jews. It operates in the 11 centers where Limmud FSU annual conferences currently take place, with an aim to provide an ongoing Jewish experience between the main Limmud FSU events. However, initiatives can be realized not only in the cities where Limmud FSU events have already occurred, but also in any other city in the following countries and centers: Russia, Ukraine, Moldova, Belarus, Australia, Canada, United States and Western Europe.

Timeline 
Below is a timeline of Limmud FSU's key conferences:

See also
Limmud
Limmud International
Limmud South Africa

References

Jewish charities based in the United States
Jewish educational organizations
Commonwealth of Independent States
2006 establishments in the United States